iLembe is one of the 11 district municipalities of KwaZulu-Natal province in South Africa. The seat of iLembe is KwaDukuza. The majority (82%) of its 606,809 people speak Zulu as their first language (2011 census). The district code is DC29. It was formerly named the King Shaka District Municipality.

Geography

Neighbours
iLembe is surrounded by:
 Umzinyathi to the north (DC24)
 the Indian Ocean to the east
 eThekwini to the south (Durban)
 Umgungundlovu to the west (DC22)
King Cetshwayo District Municipality to the north-east (DC28)

Local municipalities
The district contains the following local municipalities:

Demographics
The following statistics are from the 2011 census.

Gender

Ethnic group

Age

Politics

Election results
Election results for iLembe in the South African general election, 2004. 
 Population 18 and over: 312 758 [55.81% of total population]
 Total votes: 166 460 [29.70% of total population]
 Voting % estimate: 53.22% votes as a % of population 18 and over

See also
 Municipal Demarcation Board

References

External links 
 iLembe DM Official Website

District Municipalities of KwaZulu-Natal
iLembe District Municipality